Puntioplites is a genus of cyprinid fish that occurs in Southeast Asia.  There are currently four described species in this genus.

Species 
 Puntioplites bulu (Bleeker, 1851)
 Puntioplites falcifer H. M. Smith, 1929
 Puntioplites proctozystron (Bleeker, 1865)
 Puntioplites waandersi (Bleeker, 1858–59)

References